A by-election was held for the New South Wales Legislative Assembly electorate of Northumberland on 1868 because Atkinson Tighe had been appointed Postmaster-General in the second Martin ministry. Such ministerial by-elections were usually uncontested.

Alexander Black was a former Crown Lands Commissioner, the brother of John Black, the former Secretary for Lands. He campaigned against an unpopular government. This was the first occasion on which he stood for parliament.

Dates

Polling places

Result

Atkinson Tighe was appointed Postmaster-General in the second Martin ministry.

See also
 Electoral results for the district of Northumberland
List of New South Wales state by-elections

References

1868 elections in Australia
New South Wales state by-elections
1860s in New South Wales